Critters Attack! is a 2019 horror comedy film. It is a reboot of the 1986 film Critters, and the fifth entry in the Critters film franchise. Although returning actress Dee Wallace was assumed to be portraying a new heroine distinct from her Helen Brown character, Wallace herself confirmed that she was reprising the original role, with a name change to "Aunt Dee" due to potential legal issues.

Plot 
While babysitting two teenagers, college student Drea discovers that the alien Crites have landed in the nearby forest. They soon receive help from the mysterious Aunt Dee, who might have a history with the hungry intergalactic beasts. And more the teenagers meet a white alien Crite named Bianca.

Cast 
 Tashiana Washington as Drea
 Dee Wallace as Aunt Dee
 Jaeden Noel as Phillip
 Jack Fulton as Jake
 Ava Preston as Trissy
 Leon Clingman as Ranger Bob
 Vash Singh as Kevin Loong
 Stephen Jennings as Sheriff Lewis Haines
 Steve Blum as Critter voices

Production 
SYFY acquired the broadcasting rights to the Critters franchise in order to produce new sequels in autumn 2018. The fifth entry began filming secretly in February 2019, in South Africa. Critters Attack! was officially announced two months later.

Release 
The film was released on DVD disc and digital viewing on July 23, 2019 by Warner Bros. Home Entertainment. Unlike other Critters films, which were all rated PG-13, the film was released in an Unrated and a standard R-rated version due to having more blood and violence.

Reception 
The film received mixed reviews. On Rotten Tomatoes, the film holds an approval rating of  based on  reviews. Bloody Disgusting gave the film two out of five skulls, stating, "the fifth film suffers from a bland cast of characters, poor pacing and, most significantly, a lack of campy fun." Film School Rejects noted that the film was better than Critters: A New Binge, and described it as "a mildly entertaining creature feature that will likely find its way into the viewing habits of today's young, burgeoning horror fans when they stumble upon it on television one evening."

References

External links 
 

Critters (franchise)
2019 horror films
American comedy horror films
2010s comedy horror films
2019 films
Puppet films
Warner Bros. direct-to-video films
2019 direct-to-video films
Blue Ribbon Content films
2019 comedy films
Films shot in South Africa
Reboot films
2010s English-language films
2010s American films